Osman Murat Ülke (born 1970) is a Turkish conscientious objector.  He was imprisoned for two and a half years for refusal of military service, and was the subject of a ruling from the European Court of Human Rights.

History of the case

Ülke publicly burned his conscription orders after being called for duty September 1, 1995. A year later, he was detained in Izmir and formally arrested October 8. He was put on trial at the Military Court of the General Staff in Ankara, charged with "alienating the public from the institution of military service" and was additionally charged for burning his call-up papers and declaring his conscientious objection.

Amnesty International contacted the Turkish government, requesting that it provide alternative civilian service. Turkish law had no such provision in place. The human rights group made its suggestion based on recommendations made by the United Nations Commission on Human Rights and the Council of Europe.

The European Court of Human Rights found the nation had violated of article 3 of the convention in its persecution of Ülke. The court ordered Turkey to pay 11,000 euros to Ülke in compensation.

Continuing Issues

Even after serving his term in prison, Ülke and his family continued to be harassed, according to Human Rights Watch. A second conscientious objector, Mehmet Tarhan,  has been imprisoned by Turkish officials.

Awards and honors
 2007 Clara Immerwahr Award from the German affiliate of the International Physicians for the Prevention of Nuclear War.

References

Further reading

About Ülke's case 
The case of Osman Murat Ülke on War Resisters International

About conscientious objection in Turkey 
United Nations HCR report on military service in Turkey
WRI summary on conscientious objection in Turkey
Documentation: Conscientious objection in Turkey

Turkish conscientious objectors
1970 births
European Court of Human Rights cases involving Turkey
Living people